Gordon Malone (born 27 January 1960), known as Gus Malone, is a retired Scottish footballer who played as a midfielder in the Scottish League for Cowdenbeath and Brechin City. He later served as assistant manager at St Andrews United until May 2014.

Honours 
Brechin City

 Scottish League Second Division: 1982–83

Individual

Cowdenbeath Hall of Fame

References 

Scottish footballers
Cowdenbeath F.C. players
Scottish Football League players
Association football midfielders
1960 births
Place of birth missing (living people)
Brechin City F.C. players
Footballers from Dundee
Living people

Carnoustie Panmure F.C. players
Tayport F.C. players